Open Excursions is a jazz album by Norwegian pianist Vigleik Storaas.

Critical reception 

Terje Mosnes of the Norwegian newspaper Dagbladet gave the album five stars.

Track listing 
"How Deep Is the Ocean" (5:23)
"Elegi" (5:13)
"Kora" (2:43)
"5. Okt." (6:31)
"Waltz Is This Thing" (5:46)
"Three Coins" (6:52)
"Cuban Mood" (6:07)
"By the Fire" (6:25)

Personnel 
Piano – Vigleik Storaas

Credits 
Mastered by Jan Erik Kongshaug
Mixed by Jan Erik Kongshaug
Recorded by Jan Erik Kongshaug

Notes  
All compositions by Vigleik Storaas except where noted
Tracks 1, 3 and 7 recorded and mixed at Rainbow Studio, Oslo, 2 & 3 Dec. 1996 
All other tracks recorded in Sofienberg Kirke, Oslo, 4 Dec. 1998

References 

Vigleik Storaas albums
1999 albums